The Skymaster Single Seater is an American powered parachute that was under development by Skymaster Powered Parachutes of Hartland, Wisconsin. The aircraft was intended to be supplied as a kit for amateur construction.

The aircraft was developed from the larger two seat Skymaster Excel and introduced in about 2004,. Development ended when the company went out of business in late 2008. It appears that only one prototype was ever constructed and it is not clear if it ever flew.

Design and development
It features a  Skybolt semi-elliptical or  Quantum Advantage rectangular parachute-style wing, single-seat accommodation, tricycle landing gear and a single  single carburetor Rotax 503 engine in pusher configuration. Both the  Rotax 582 and the  dual carburetor Rotax 503 engines were also intended to be offered for the production model.

The aircraft carriage is built from bolted aluminium tubing. In flight steering is accomplished via handles that actuate the canopy brakes, creating roll and yaw. On the ground the aircraft has lever-controlled nosewheel steering. The main landing gear incorporates spring and rod suspension.

The prototype was configured with hand-only controls to allow it to be flown by paraplegic wheelchair aviators. Company data indicates that this option was intended to be offered at no charge.

Specifications (version)

References

External links
Company website archives on Archive.org
Photo of the Skymaster Single Seater

Single Seater
2000s United States sport aircraft
2000s United States ultralight aircraft
Single-engined pusher aircraft
Powered parachutes
Homebuilt aircraft